The 1948–49 Salvadoran Football Championship was the 11th season of the first division of Salvadoran football. C.D. Once Municipal was the season's champion, the club's first title.

League table 

A total of 305 matches were held during the 1948–49 league season. Seven matches at the end of the season were not played as C.D. Once Municipal was already determined to be as the league's champion, leaving the remaining matches as unnecessary.

References 

1948
1948 in association football
1949 in association football